Cecil George Cooke (May 31, 1923 – May 1, 1983) was a sailor and Olympic champion from the Bahamas. He competed at the 1964 Summer Olympics in Tokyo, where he won a gold medal in the Star class, together with Durward Knowles. He was born in and died in Nassau, New Providence, Bahamas.

References

External links
 
 
 

1923 births
1983 deaths
Bahamian male sailors (sport)
Olympic sailors of the Bahamas
Olympic gold medalists for the Bahamas
Olympic medalists in sailing
Sailors at the 1964 Summer Olympics – Star
Medalists at the 1964 Summer Olympics
Sportspeople from Nassau, Bahamas